Nikki is an American sitcom television series that aired on The WB from October 9, 2000, to January 27, 2002. Nikki was a starring vehicle for Nikki Cox, who had previously starred in another WB sitcom, Unhappily Ever After, which ran for five seasons. Looking to capitalize on Cox's popularity, Bruce Helford created a sitcom that featured her as the title character.

Synopsis
Cox portrays Nikki White, a Las Vegas showgirl living in Las Vegas with her husband Dwight White (Nick von Esmarch), a professional wrestler. The couple is portrayed as working class, attempting to follow their passions while finding fame and fortune in Las Vegas. Also in the cast are Nikki's best friend and fellow dancer Mary (Susan Egan), and Dwight's boss Jupiter (Toby Huss). Also a recurring character were Dwight's mother Marion (Christine Estabrook), who is angry with Nikki for "luring" her son into a marriage and away from a safe, secure job with a future as a tax attorney; Ken and Alice Gillespie (Todd Robert Anderson and Jacqueline Heinze), Nikki and Dwight's conservative neighbors;

In season one, each episode started with a musical number, where Nikki and her fellow showgirls at "the worst casino in Las Vegas" perform a dance. Their costumes included Godzilla, cockroaches (dancing to "We Are Family"), brides who remove their dresses and veils to reveal red devil costumes and horns, and once she appeared as the severed head of Marie Antoinette. In the second episode of season two, Nikki loses her job when the casino is sold.

Similar to Murphy Brown, all of the episodes in season one, plus some in season two, have a different song be the theme song, while Nikki performed a dance routine. However, in season two, the theme song changed to a standardized intro, to a remixed version of "She's a Lady" by Tom Jones.

Cast

Main
 Nikki Cox as Nikki White
 Nick von Esmarch as Dwight White
 Susan Egan as Mary Campbell
 Toby Huss as Jupiter

Recurring
 Brad William Henke as Thor
 Steve Valentine as Martine
 Christine Estabrook as Marion
 Marina Benedict as Luna
 Todd Robert Anderson as Ken Gillespie
 Jacqueline Heinze as Alice Gillespie
 Arturo Brachetti as Antonio

Notable guest stars
 Ever Carradine as Patti ("Fierce")
 Lisa Marie Varon as Chickasaurus ("Topless")
 Phil LaMarr as Richard ("The Next Step", "Milli Vanikki")
 Arden Myrin as Cheryl ("The Ex Factor")
 Kevin Nash as The Big Easy ("Stealing Nikki", "Gimme Shelter")
 The Fabulous Moolah as herself ("The Jupiter and Mary Chain")
 Kathy Kinney ("Let It Ride")
 Randy Savage as Pretty Boy ("Fallback" 14)
 Joel McKinnon Miller as Mr. Higgins ("Fallback")
 Amanda Bearse as Marcy Rhoades ("Technical Knockup")
 David Garrison as Steve Rhoades ("Technical Knockup")
 Meredith Bishop as Lurleen ("Technical Knockup", "Vaya Con Nikki")
 Drew Carey as Barry Tenzer, a business magnate who buys CWF ("Superhero Blues")
 Sheryl Underwood as Janet ("Working Girl")
 Ian Gomez
 The Blue Meanie

Carrie Ann Inaba, Cris Judd, Lane Napper, and Nancy O'Meara appeared in multiple episodes as dancers and in various minor roles.

Production
In July 1999, The WB placed a straight-to-order series from The Drew Carey Show co-creator Bruce Helford as a vehicle for Unhappily Ever After and Norm co-star Nikki Cox. Nikki was formally ordered to series in May 2000, and was placed on The WB's fall lineup for a Sunday Night comedy block.

On October 31, 2000, The WB ordered a full 22-episode season of Nikki. The network renewed the show for a 22-episode second season at its upfronts in May 2001. However, in January 2002, the network pulled the series, and shut down production after only 19 episodes due to very low ratings. Six episodes were left unaired in the United States.

Episodes

Series overview

Season 1 (2000–01)

Season 2 (2001–02)

Syndication
The show currently airs in the Netherlands on Comedy Central Family, MTV3 Sarja in Finland, and Kanal 9 in Sweden.

References

External links
 
 

2000s American sitcoms
2000 American television series debuts
2002 American television series endings
English-language television shows
Television series by Mohawk Productions
Television series by Warner Bros. Television Studios
Television series created by Bruce Helford
Television shows set in Las Vegas
The WB original programming